Madeleine Beaumont (24 August 1883 – 26 August 1975) was a British figure skater. She competed in the pairs event at the 1920 Summer Olympics.

References

1883 births
1975 deaths
British female pair skaters
Olympic figure skaters of Great Britain
Figure skaters at the 1920 Summer Olympics
Sportspeople from Liverpool